Over the Next Hill is the twenty-third studio album by the band Fairport Convention, released in 2004.

Reception
Over the Next Hill has been described by Mojo as "simply [Fairport's] best album in 25 years".

Recording
The album was recorded during March and April 2004 at Dave Pegg's Woodworm Studio, Barford St. Michael, Oxfordshire, UK. It was engineered and mixed by Mark Tucker, and the executive producer was Dave Pegg. It was the first release on the band's newly created Matty Grooves label.

Track listing

"Over the Next Hill" (Steve Tilston) – 4:21
"I'm Already There" (Chris Leslie) – 6:41
"Wait for the Tide to Come In" (Ben Bennion) – 4:37
"Canny Capers" (Ric Sanders) – 5:11
"Over the Falls" (Chris Leslie) – 4:31
"The Wassail Song" (Traditional; arranged by Fairport Convention) – 3:16
"The Fossil Hunter" (Chris Leslie) – 6:15
"Willow Creek" (Steve Tilston, Chris Parkinson) – 3:51
"Westward" (Julie Matthews) – 4:09
"Some Special Place" (Ric Sanders) – 3:39
"Si Tu Dois Partir" – (Bob Dylan) 3:27
"Auld Lang Syne" (hidden track) - (Traditional)

Personnel
Fairport Convention
Gerry Conway – percussion, drums
Chris Leslie – mandolin, bouzouki, violin, ukulele, vocals, Native American flute, electric mandolin
Simon Nicol – guitar, vocals
Dave Pegg – 5-string bass, acoustic bass guitar, mandolin, vocals, double bass
Ric Sanders – mandolin, violin

Additional personnel
Martin Lamble - percussion on "Si Tu Dois Partir" (added from original 1969 recording)
Anna Ryder - accordion
Chris While - vocals on "Si Tu Dois Partir"
Simon & Hilary Mayor - vocals on "Auld Lang Syne"

References

Fairport Convention albums
2004 albums